Spes is the Roman goddess of hope.

Spes may also refer to:
 Hope (virtue), spes in Latin

Acronym
 Synergistic Processing Elements (SPEs), a type of accelerated processing unit in a Cell microprocessor
 South Place Ethical Society, former name of the Conway Hall Ethical Society
 Stanley Park Ecology Society
 Swedish Public Employment Service, a Swedish government agency
 School of Philosophy and Economic Science, worldwide organisation based in London
 St. Paul's Episcopal School, in Mobile, Alabama

Other uses
 Spes Bona, a suburb of Johannesburg, South Africa
 Spes Utia Island or Spesutie Island, in the Chesapeake Bay, Maryland, United States
 Temple of Spes, Ancient Rome

See also
 Gaudium et spes, the Pastoral Constitution on the Church in the Modern World, was one of the principal documents of the Second Vatican Council
 SPE (disambiguation)